Francesco Joseph (Frank J.) Barbaro (December 18, 1927 – September 4, 2016) was an American politician who served in the New York State Assembly from the 47th district (Bensonhurst) from 1973 to 1996.

Early years
A son of immigrants, after high school he served in the navy before college (NYU, Brooklyn Law School). Prior to running for office he was a longshoreman.

Elected positions
He "won election as a legislator 12 times" and tried but "lost elections for Brooklyn borough president, mayor and Congress." In 1981 Barbaro was "Edward I. Koch's chief challenger for re-election to a second term as mayor of New York." Barbaro's 2004 attempted run for congress "made the general election for the 13th Congressional District uncharacteristically feisty and competitive."

An example of Barbaro working as a legislator with others involved reclaiming a Bensonhurst public school that was transferred to the Transit Authority in 1981 due to it being underutilized. By 1992, with population growth, it was needed, yet in 1998 it still hadn't been given back.

Judge
Barbaro also "served for six years as a State Supreme Court justice."

One of his decisions bothered him, years later, and he tried, unsuccessfully, to reverse the damage he perceived was his fault.

He died of heart failure on September 4, 2016, in Watervliet, New York at age 88.

Family
Barbaro ("BAR-ba-roe") was survived by his wife Mary, three daughters, four grandchildren, and a sister.

References

1927 births
2016 deaths
Democratic Party members of the New York State Assembly
Brooklyn Law School alumni
New York University alumni
20th-century American politicians
Candidates in the 1981 United States elections